West Eats Meet (styled west eats meet) is an album released in 2004 by Canadian folk music artist Harry Manx.

Track listing
 "Help Me" – 3:11
 "Make Way for the Living" – 4:26
 "Shadow of the Whip" – 3:29
 "The Great Unknown" – 4:07
 "Forgive & Remember" – 3:38
 "Sittin' on Top of the World" – 3:29
 "That Knowing Look of Fate" – 3:36
 "Stir a Little Breeze" – 3:28
 "Tough & Tender" – 4:07
 "The Ways of Love" - 4:33
 "Something of Your Grace" - 3:35
 "Hector's Song" - 2:15

References

2004 albums